Rashida Ellis is an American boxer.

She won a medal at the 2019 AIBA Women's World Boxing Championships.

She represented the United States at the 2020 Summer Olympics. She is openly lesbian.

References

Year of birth missing (living people)
Living people
American women boxers
Sportspeople from Lynn, Massachusetts
AIBA Women's World Boxing Championships medalists
Lightweight boxers
Boxers at the 2019 Pan American Games
Pan American Games bronze medalists for the United States
Pan American Games medalists in boxing
Medalists at the 2019 Pan American Games
Boxers from Massachusetts
American LGBT sportspeople
Boxers at the 2020 Summer Olympics
Olympic boxers of the United States
LGBT people from Massachusetts
LGBT boxers
LGBT African Americans
Lesbian sportswomen
African-American boxers
21st-century African-American sportspeople
21st-century African-American women